ABPI may refer to:

 Ankle-brachial pressure index, a measure of the fall in blood pressure in the arteries supplying the legs
 Association of the British Pharmaceutical Industry, the trade association for companies in the UK producing prescription medicines